Jardim Carvalho (meaning Oak Garden in English) is a neighbourhood (bairro) in the city of Porto Alegre, the state capital of Rio Grande do Sul, in Brazil. It was created by Law 6720 from November 21, 1990.

Neighbourhoods in Porto Alegre